Somatidia villosa is a species of beetle in the family Cerambycidae. It was described by Lea in 1929. It was discovered in Australia.

References

villosa
Beetles described in 1929